Akhil Giri is an Indian politician and the present Minister of Fisheries in the Government of West Bengal. He is also an MLA, elected from the Ramnagar constituency in the 2011 West Bengal state assembly election.

References 

State cabinet ministers of West Bengal
Living people
1959 births